Flying machines s.r.o. is a Czech manufacturer of light aircraft based in Rasošky. The company was established in 2004 and specializes in kit aircraft for amateur construction and ultralight trikes.

Aircraft
Products include:
FM250 Vampire light sport aircraft.
FM250 Mystique light sport aircraft.
FM301 Stream ultralight.
B612 single-seat light aircraft.

References

External links
 

Aircraft manufacturers of the Czech Republic and Czechoslovakia
Companies established in 2004
Czech brands
Ultralight trikes
Homebuilt aircraft